Bhagwanpur is a rural municipality in Siraha District in Province No. 2 of south-eastern Nepal. At the time of the 2011 Nepal census it had a population of 20957 people living.
It is located nearly 370 kilometers or 107 miles east of the capital, Kathmandu.

Thadi or Thadi Viswaspatti is the main market place in the municipality and a very old border town and a market place of Nepal in Siraha District bordering Indian town of Laukaha.

Thadi is one of the few towns which is a part of agreed route for Mutual Trade between India and Nepal. Nepal Government has set up a dedicated customs office in the town.

The town connects Lahan, Nepal to India.

Infrastructure

Rajbiraj Airport is the nearest airport, roughly 35 km away from Thadi. Shree Airlines operates daily flights between Rajbiraj and Kathmandu

The town is also connected to Laukaha Bazar railway station which is located in adjacent Indian town of Laukaha.

There are various bus operators who operate direct bus from Thadi in Bhagwanpur to Kathmandu via Lahan, Nepal which is 18 kn north of Thadi and also connects to Mahendra Highway. It is one of the major routes for tourist from India to go to travel Nepal.

References

External links 

 UN map of the municipalities of  Siraha District

Populated places in Siraha District
Rural municipalities of Nepal established in 2017
Rural municipalities in Madhesh Province